Frank Sabichi (October 4, 1842– April 12, 1900) was an attorney and developer of extensive properties who sat on the Los Angeles, California, Common Council, the legislative arm of that city, from 1870 to 1874 and again from 1897 to 1899. He was council president in 1873–74.

Biography

Sabichi was born on October 4, 1842 to Mathias Sabichi of Austria and his Mexican wife in the Pueblo de Los Ángeles, then within Alta California, Mexico. At age eight, he was taken to England and was placed in the Royal Naval Academy in Portsmouth, England. He saw service in the 1857 Sepoy Rebellion in India and the 1854–55 Siege of Sebastapol during the Crimean War.

He returned to Los Angeles, in the U.S. state of California, in 1860 at about age 18 and began the private study of law in the offices of Glassell, Smith & Patton. He practiced law for a time but gave it up to manage and develop his extensive land holdings. He was credited with opening and developing East 7th Street on his family properties. He was a charter member of the Pioneer Society of Southern California and the Native Sons of the Golden West.

A Catholic, Sabichi was married to Magdalena Wolfskill, the daughter of pioneer settler William Wolfskill, on May 4, 1865. They had thirteen children. Those who survived were Frank W., Agatha (Mrs. J. J. Fay), Joseph Rodney, George Carlos, William Wolfskill, Louis S., and Beatrice (Mrs. S. Mitchell).

Sabichi died at the age of fifty-eight on April 12, 1900 in his home at 2437 South Figueroa Street. A doctor in attendance said the cause was probably "due to a stroke of apoplexy."

Public service

Sabichi was elected to one-year terms in the Los Angeles Common Council in 1870 to 1874 and again from 1897 to 1899. He was council president in 1873–74, and he was on the city Fire Commission between 1897 and 1900.

References

Access to the Los Angeles Times links may require the use of a library card.

Businesspeople from Los Angeles
Land owners from California
Lawyers from Los Angeles
1842 births
1900 deaths
Los Angeles City Council members
19th-century American politicians
19th-century American businesspeople
19th-century American lawyers